Syed Mahmood Ali (1928 – 11 July 2008; Urdu:سید محمود علی) was a Pakistani radio, film, television and stage artist.

Early life and career
Mahmood Ali was born in Hyderabad Deccan in 1928. Mahmood Ali began his career with the All India Radio in 1945. He migrated to Pakistan after independence, arriving in Lahore in 1947. He soon moved to Karachi and joined Radio Pakistan during its early days, after the independence of Pakistan, in 1947. Mahmood Ali contributed to Radio Pakistan and the Pakistani television for more than 50 years.

Radio
His notable contributions are:
 Syed Mahmood Ali started his acting career from a radio play, Khawaja Moinuddin's Theater.
 Haamid Mian Kay Haan (a Radio Pakistan play in the 1950s)
 Mirza Ghalib Bunder Road Pe (a Radio Pakistan play in the 1960s)
 Lal Qila Sey Lalu Khait Tak (a Radio Pakistan play in the 1960s)

TV
 In 1965, Ali joined Pakistan television as an employee.
 His role as 'Maulvi Sahib' in Pakistan Television Corporation's production, PTV TV drama series Taleem-e-Balighan (1966), became very popular.
 Khuda Ki Basti (serial) ( first production in 1969, second production in 1974 by PTV)
 Zair, Zabar, Pesh (1974)
 Hawain (1997)

Films
Mahmood Ali also worked in over 25 films:
 Chori Chhuppe (1965)
 Insan Aur Gadha (1973)
 Khush Naseeb (1980s)

Death and legacy
Syed Mahmood Ali died on 11 July 2008 due to cardiac arrest at age 80. He was buried at Wadi-e-Hussain graveyard in Karachi.

Awards and recognition
 Pride of Performance Award by the President of Pakistan in 1985

See also 
 List of Lollywood actors

References

External links 
 

1928 births
2008 deaths
Male actors from Hyderabad, India
Pakistani male film actors
Pakistani male television actors
Pakistani male stage actors
Pakistani radio personalities
Recipients of the Pride of Performance
Male actors from Karachi
Radio personalities from Karachi
Pakistani people of Hyderabadi descent